Dundonald (Gaelic: Dùn Dhòmhnaill) is a village in South Ayrshire, Scotland.

The village

The village is mostly known for Dundonald Castle, which was built in the 14th century by King Robert II, on the ruins of a castle built earlier (in 1260) by his grandfather, Alexander Comyn. It served the Scottish kings for 150 years.

The ruins of Old Auchans Castle lies nearby, the previous residence of Susanna Montgomery, Lady Eglinton. In Dundonald Woods near the old Hallyards Farm are the ruins of Kemp Law Dun, an Iron Age vitrified hillfort, close to the site of St Mary's Chapel.

Since 1945, it serves mostly as a dormitory town for the larger towns in the area.

The parish church
The present church (NS 366 343) was built in 1803, however the first recorded church was present in 1229 when it was gifted to the convent at Damilling and later to Paisley Abbey, with whom it stayed until the Reformation.

Views in and around Dundonald

New Auchans House 
A new Auchans House (NS 36035 34900) was built circa 1819, designed by William  Wallace. The house was built for the Earl of Eglinton's commissioner Monteaulieu Burgess of Coilsfield, followed in 1885 by the Hon. Greville Richard Vernon, son of the 1st Lord Lyveden. Major Coats of the Paisley thread manufacturers tenanted the house at one time, as did the Beattie banking family. In 1947 the Earl of Eglinton sold the house to the Earl of Dundonald. The house was then sold by the Earl of Dundonald in 1960 to a builder and finally demolished in 1970 and the site has since been developed as a housing estate on the edge of the town.

Natural history 

Dundonald Woods (NS363343) are one of the most extensive areas of elm-dominated woodlands in Ayrshire. Ash, oak and sycamore are also abundant; much of the policies are composed of derelict-coppiced-type growth from trees felled in the Second World War. Some conifer plantations are present. Wetland habitats are also present, including the Collennan Reservoir, springs and a eutrophic loch, contributing to the high biodiversity of the site. Dog's Mercury, Wood Melick, Broad-leaved Helleborine, and Giant Bellflower are amongst the significant plants present.

The small loch of Galrigs was located near Laurieston Farm and the ruin of Lochside Farm; it is now evident as a marshy area dominated by rushes. Galrigs was the old name for the lands of Newfield.

Sport

Troon Dundonald A.F.C.
The prominent sports team in the village is Troon Dundonald A.F.C.

The club was formed in 1983 by 3 'ageing' players, at which time they were named Troon Burns A.F.C., and have now surpassed their 30th season in the Ayrshire Amateur Football Association. During this time they have had a few name changes, sometimes due to sponsorship commitments, but in 1998/99 season, they settled on Troon Amateurs Football Club. The club President, Stuart Urquhart, still remains from the original founders of the club and he is as passionate as ever about everything that goes on within the club, as well as with Amateur football in general.

In the years since their formation, they have enjoyed 3 promotions in back to back seasons, 1983/84 through 1985/86, which saw them go from the 4th Division to the 1st of Ayrshire's Amateur Leagues, which is one of the largest & toughest amateur leagues in Scotland.

In recent years, the club have developed to add youth teams below the amateur structure.

In 2021 the club dug up the playing fields without properly consulting the community or obtaining the correct approvals, and were instructed to submit a retrospective planning application which is available for public comment.

Dundonald Highland Games
The main sports event in Dundonald is the annual "Dundonald Highland Games" which brings the whole village together for the weekend in sport.

The Slough of Despond

On the boundary of Dundonald and Symington parishes lies an area known as the 'Slough of Despond'.

The burn in this area, rising near the old Broadhirst Farm, has long been known as the Slough, the Scots equivalent spelling is Sleugh, meaning a marsh or quagmire. It is not known how the name 'Slough of  Despond' was added to the area, however it is recorded since the mid 19th century and may be linked to the nearby limekilns that were generally notorious for the acrid 'hell-like' smoke that issued from them.

The Slough Burn still rises from the marshy area below the Broadhirst Woods, however the limestone quarry that served the limekilns is now abandoned, surviving as an area rich in wildlife, containing old woodland indicator plants such as Wood Anemone (Anemone nemorosa), Bluebell (Hyacinthoides non-scripta), Wood Sorrel (Oxalis acetosella), Dog's Mercury (Mercurialis perennis), Herb Robert (Geranium robertianum) and other species. The Slough Burn runs down past Dankeith House, Templeton and Fortacres, Todrigs and through Caprington, to join the River Irvine near Gatehead.

Events
 August - "Dundonald Highland Games" - Traditional Scottish Highland Games.
 May - "Dundonald Music Festival" - A weekend of booked bands and jam sessions.

See also
 Murder of James Young

References 
Notes

Sources
 Campbell, Thorbjørn (2003). Ayrshire. A Historical Guide. Edinburgh : Birlinn. .
 Edwards, Steven (1981). Important Woodland sites for Wildlife conservation in Ayrshire. Scottish Wildlife Trust.
 Love, Dane (2003). Ayrshire : Discovering a County'''. Ayr : Fort Publishing. .
 Love, Dane (2006). Lost Ayrshire : Ayrshire's Lost Architectural Heritage. Edinburgh : Birlinn Ltd. .
 Stewart, Gordon (2004). Old Auchans House, Dundonald.'' Pub. Friends of Dundonald Castle.

External links
The Dundonald Quarry Branch
Kemp Law Iron Age Vitrified Dun, Dundonald

Villages in South Ayrshire
Clan Cochrane